Betta coccina is a species of betta native to Peninsular Malaysia and Sumatra, Indonesia. It can be found in the aquarium trade.

References

coccina
Taxa named by Jörg Vierke
Fish described in 1979